Rapley is a surname. Notable people with the surname include:

Curtis Rapley (born 1990), New Zealand rower
Frank Rapley (born 1937), New Zealand cricketer
Kevin Rapley (born 1977), British footballer
Teremoana Rapley (born 1973), New Zealand singer, MC and television presenter